The Chorioactidaceae are a family of cup fungi in the order Pezizales containing seven species distributed among five genera. Pseudosarcosoma was added in 2013 to contain P. latahense when molecular phylogenetic studies demonstrated the fungus to be more closely related to the Chorioactidaceae than to Sarcosoma (family Sarcosomataceae).

References

Ascomycota families
Pezizales